Williamstown is an electoral district of the Legislative Assembly in the Australian state of Victoria. It is a 33 km2 urban electorate in the inner south-western suburbs of Melbourne, encompassing the suburbs of Brooklyn, Newport, Spotswood, Williamstown and Yarraville. The electorate had a population of 54,426 as of the 2006 census.

Williamstown is one of only three electorates (along with Brighton and Richmond) to have been contested at every election since 1856. It is a very safe seat for the Labor Party, which has held it for all but two terms since 1889 and without interruption since 1904. Notable former members include John Lemmon, who held the seat for a Victorian record 51 years until his retirement in 1955, and former Premiers Joan Kirner and Steve Bracks.

Steve Bracks held the seat from a by-election in 1994 until his surprise resignation on 30 July 2007.  A by-election was held on 15 September 2007, resulting in the election of Labor's Wade Noonan.

The seat is almost entirely within the equally safe federal seat of Gellibrand.

Members for Williamstown

Election results

Historical maps

External links
 District profile from the Victorian Electoral Commission
 Map of the Electoral District of Williamstown, 1855

References

Electoral districts of Victoria (Australia)
1856 establishments in Australia
Williamstown, Victoria
City of Hobsons Bay
Electoral districts and divisions of Greater Melbourne